Highpoint is a Canadian 1982 action comedy-thriller film directed by Peter Carter and starring Richard Harris, Christopher Plummer and Beverly D'Angelo.

The film was shot on location in Montreal and Toronto, and is perhaps best remembered for its climax atop CN Tower, in which stuntman Dar Robinson (doubling for Plummer) makes the 700-foot jump in freefall, protected only by a hidden parachute.

The film underwent a lengthy and troubled post-production period. Originally filmed in 1979 as a comedic thriller in the vein of  North by Northwest, the film was shelved for two years during which extensive reshoots took place. The film was given a limited release in Europe in 1982. Due to negative critical and audience reception concerning its convoluted plot and poor pacing, the film was heavily re-edited by North American distributor New World Pictures, removing much of the comedy and replacing John Addison's original score with one by Christopher Young. This version was released in theaters in 1984, and provided the basis for future home video releases.

Plot
Lewis Kinney is an accountant who goes to work for a wealthy family, the Hatchers. James Hatcher has embezzled $10 million from the mafia and the CIA, and now they are both seeking him. Kinney falls for James' sister Lise and is pursued by two bumbling henchman, Centino and Falco. He eventually outwits them.

Cast
Richard Harris as Lewis Kinney 
Christopher Plummer as James Hatcher 
Beverly D'Angelo as Lise Hatcher
Kate Reid as Mrs. Hatcher 
Peter Donat as Maronzella 
Robin Gammell as Banner 
Saul Rubinek as Centino 
Maury Chaykin as Falco
George Buza as Alex

Production
The film was based on a script by Richard Guttman, who was a partner in a Hollywood public relations film. It was originally to star Richard Harris and Katherine Ross. Ross was replaced by Beverly D'Angelo.

Filming started 30 July 1979. The movie was financed by Canadian money, raised under tax concessions which led to the Canadian film boom at the time.

The movie was reportedly so bad that another $2 million was spent on re-editing.

Proposed Follow Up
Harris and Plummer were to appear in another Canadian film, The Burning Book but only $3 million of the $7 million budget could be raised.

References

External links
IMDB

1982 films
1980s action comedy films
Canadian action comedy films
1980s comedy thriller films
English-language Canadian films
Films directed by Peter Carter
Films scored by John Addison
Films scored by Christopher Young
New World Pictures films
1982 comedy films
1980s English-language films
1980s Canadian films